Fenimorea chaaci is a species of sea snail, a marine gastropod mollusk in the family Drilliidae.

Description
The shell grows to a length of 20 mm.

Distribution
This species occurs in the Caribbean Sea off Yucatán, Mexico.

References

External links
  Tucker, J.K. 2004 Catalog of recent and fossil turrids (Mollusca: Gastropoda). Zootaxa 682:1–1295
 

chaaci
Gastropods described in 1995